Erikssonia acraeina, the Eriksson's copper, is a species of butterfly in the family Lycaenidae. It was long thought to be monotypic within the genus Erikssonia. It is found in the southern parts of the Democratic Republic of the Congo, southern and south-eastern Angola, and western and north-western Zambia (Mongu, Kataba, Mundwiji Plain).

The South African population on the Waterberg is now treated as Erikssonia edgei.

Adults are on wing through most of the summer months, having been recorded from October to April, with a peak in activity from January to March.

References

External links
Taxonomy, Biology, Biogeography, Evolution and Conservation of the Genus Erikssonia Trimen (Lepidoptera: Lycaenidae)

Sources

Butterflies described in 1891
Erikssonia (butterfly)
Butterflies of Africa
Taxonomy articles created by Polbot